Xerochlamys villosa is a tree in the family Sarcolaenaceae. It is endemic to Madagascar.

Description
The flowers, generally solitary or occasionally in inflorescences of two flowers, feature white petals.

Distribution and habitat
Xerochlamys villosa is native to southwestern Madagascar. Its habitat is forests from  altitude.

Conservation
Xerochlamys villosa is threatened by logging for use as firewood and by wildfires. The species is present in Isalo National Park.

References

villosa
Endemic flora of Madagascar
Trees of Madagascar
Plants described in 1915